Alqueva may refer to:
 Alqueva Dam
 Alqueva (Portel), a civil parish in the municipality of Portel